Lepionurus is a genus of plants in the family Opiliaceae described as a genus in 1826.

It contains only one known species, Lepionurus sylvestris, native to Yunnan, Bhutan, Assam, W Indonesia, Laos, Malaysia, Myanmar, Nepal, Sikkim, Thailand, Vietnam.

References

Opiliaceae
Monotypic Santalales genera
Flora of Asia